is a Japanese composer, most recognized for his video game soundtracks during the 1990s, particularly for the Shining series of games. He has worked for companies such as Sega, Enix, Climax Entertainment, and Game Arts. Takenouchi studied music at the Tokyo University of the Arts, where he and fellow composer Hayato Matsuo were classmates. Around this time, he was involved with several projects, including arrangement under the supervision of Koichi Sugiyama.

Takenouchi's compositional approach often encompasses elements of progressive rock, jazz fusion, and symphonic, frequently making use of odd time signatures, virtuosic musical lines, syncopation and dissonance. He cited King Crimson, Yes, Frank Zappa, and Emerson, Lake & Palmer as some of his influences. In addition to his work on video game soundtracks, Takenouchi also composed music for some of the early releases on Shinji Hosoe's Troubadour record label. In 2000, he composed and arranged the song "Shower" for Rina Chinen. He also plays keyboards for "Autumn-River Willow" under the pseudonym of "dj".

Works

Video games
(1991) Dragon Quest: The Adventure of Dai (Anime) (arranger, with Hayato Matsuo)
(1991) Jewel Master (Sega Genesis)
(1992) Double Moon Densetsu (Famicom)
(1992) Landstalker: The Treasures of King Nole (Sega Genesis)
(1992) E.V.O.: Search for Eden (Super NES) (arranger, original compositions by Koichi Sugiyama)
(1992) Shining Force Gaiden (Sega Game Gear)
(1992) Air Combat II: Special (FM Towns)
(1993) Aguri Suzuki F-1 Super Driving (Game Boy)
(1993) Shining Force: The Sword of Hajya (Game Gear)
(1993) Shining Force II (Mega Drive)
(1994) Shining Force CD (Sega CD)
(1994) Road Prosecutor (Sega Mega LD)
(1995) Gamera: Gyaosu Gekimetsu Sakusen (Super Famicom)
(1995) Granhistoria: Genshi Sekaiki (Super Famicom)
(1995) Shining Force Gaiden: Final Conflict (Game Gear)
(1995) Shining Wisdom (Sega Saturn)
(1996) Gungriffon: The Eurasian Conflict (Sega Saturn)
(1996) SD Gundam Over Galaxian (PlayStation)

Other
(1993) G.T.R - "Gosling"
(1993) Great Wall - "Delirhythm E-BB1"
(1994) T·O·U·R·S - "Unparalleled"
(1996) Cho Aniki Show II - "Sak-kwa DANCE"
(2008) DAWN for Nohkan and String Orchestra
(2008) Trio for Nohkan, Clarinet and Bassoon
(2009) Suite for Noh and Orchestra
(2010) GIONSYOJA for Utai, Violin and Orchestra
(2010) Autumn-River Willow - you you you you you
(2011) KOKAI for Utai and Orchestra
(2012) Rooms for solo Piano
(2012) Autumn-River Willow - Brand new summer day
(2013) Sonata for Bass Tuba and Piano
(2013) Autumn-River Willow - Kimi to!
(2014) Autumn-River Willow - Jewelry Box

References

External links
Official website 
TAKE'S MUSIC FACTORY (Old) 

1967 births
Japanese composers
Japanese male composers
Living people
Musicians from Saitama Prefecture
Tokyo University of the Arts alumni
Video game composers